Robert Relf (born 29 January 1971) is an Australian former professional rugby league footballer who played in the 1990s and 2000s.

Background
Relf grew up in a small town called Gloucester, New South Wales, Australia.

Playing career
Relf played local football in the Gloucester area and then was offered a contract to play for Canterbury-Bankstown.  In 1994, Relf played 10 matches for the club but was not included in the grand final losing side against Canberra.  

In 1995, Relf played 24 games for the club but missed out on playing in the club's 1995 grand final victory over Manly due to injury.   Relf played at second-row forward for the Canterbury-Bankstown Bulldogs in their loss at the 1998 NRL grand final to the Brisbane Broncos.  

In total, Relf made 126 appearances overall for Canterbury and his last game for the club was a 24-22 loss against Melbourne in the 1999 finals series. 

Relf joined North Queensland at the end of the 1999 season and played 2 years for the club as they finished last in 2000 and second last in 2001.  In 2002, Relf signed to play for the Widnes Vikings.  Relf played 3 seasons for Widnes and retired at the end of 2004.

References

External links
Profile at thebulldogs.com.au

1971 births
Living people
Australian rugby league players
North Queensland Cowboys players
Canterbury-Bankstown Bulldogs players
Rugby league second-rows
Rugby league players from New South Wales
Sportsmen from New South Wales
Widnes Vikings players